The Order of Labour ( / ,) was a Yugoslav civil decoration awarded to both civilians and military personnel for outstanding work performance. Established in May 1945, the order was awarded in three classes until the dissolution of Yugoslavia in 1992.

Gallery

References

Awards established in 1945
Orders, decorations, and medals of Yugoslavia
1945 establishments in Yugoslavia
1992 disestablishments in Yugoslavia
Awards disestablished in 1992